Kostanjevica may refer to several places in Slovenia:

Kostanjevica na Krasu, a settlement in the Municipality of Miren-Kostanjevica
Kostanjevica na Krki, capital of the Municipality of Kostanjevica na Krki
Kostanjevica, Šentrupert, a settlement in the Municipality of Šentrupert
Municipality of Kostanjevica na Krki
Municipality of Miren-Kostanjevica